The Nijinsky Stakes is a Canadian Thoroughbred horse race held annually at Woodbine Racetrack in Toronto. Since 2009, it has been run in late July. The Grade II race is open to horses aged three years and up and is run on Woodbine Racetrack's E. P. Taylor Turf Course at a distance of one and one eight miles. The race currently offers a purse of CAD$175,000 added.

Inaugurated as the Hong Kong Jockey Club Trophy Stakes in 1998, it was raced during the third week of July on turf at a distance of  miles. In 2002, the Chinese Cultural Centre sponsored the race and it was renamed the Chinese Cultural Centre Stakes. In 2006, the race was renamed the Nijinsky Stakes and the Chinese Cultural Centre assumed sponsorship for the Seagram Cup Stakes .

The race honors the Canadian-born Nijinsky, the 1970 English Triple Crown champion and a son of Canada's most famous horse and most important sire of the 20th century, Northern Dancer.

Records
Time record:
 2:24.45 @ 1 1/2 miles : Tiz A Slam  (2019)
 2:12.37 @ 1 3/8 miles : Shoal Water (2004) 
 2:00.60 @ 1 1/4 miles : Seaside Retreat (2008) (new course record)
 1:45.28 @ 1 1/8 miles : So Long George (2013)

Most wins by a horse
 2 – Up With the Birds (2014, 2016)
 2 – Windwards Islands (2010, 2011)
 2 – Tiz A Slam (2018, 2019)

Most wins by a jockey:
 3 – Todd Kabel (2003, 2004, 2012)

Most wins by a trainer:
 6 – Mark Frostad (2000, 2002, 2003, 2004, 2010, 2011)

Most wins by an owner:
 8 – Sam-Son Farm (2000, 2002, 2003, 2004, 2010, 2011, 2014, 2016)

Winners

See also
 List of Canadian flat horse races

References

Turf races in Canada
Graded stakes races in Canada
Open middle distance horse races
Woodbine Racetrack
Recurring events established in 1998
1998 establishments in Ontario